Praveen Kumar (born 2 October 1986) is a former Indian cricketer who bowled right-arm medium-pace. In first-class cricket, he played for Uttar Pradesh cricket team. He relied on his ability to swing the ball both ways along with line and length. In October 2018, he announced his retirement from all forms of cricket.

Personal life
Kumar was born at Laprana village of Shamli district on October 2, 1986, to a police head constable Sakat Singh Khaiwal and Murti Devi Khaiwal. He married Sapna Choudhary in 2010, she is a national-level Shooting sport player.

He owns a farmhouse in Barnava village and Praveen Restaurant and Wedding Banquet in Meerut on NH-58 Rohta Road Crossing.

He entered politics by joining Samajwadi Party before the UP assembly.

Kumar has had well-documented struggles with stress-related illnesses, which he has worked hard to rectify. According to Cricinfo, he once beat up a doctor after having mud splashed on clothes by said doctor's car as Kumar stepped out of a shop where he had gone to buy a gun. The beating was administered in a glassware shop, which sustained damage.

He also tried to commit suicide due to his stress and now he attended counselling and looking forward towards his life.

The Cricketing Lime Light
He was the joint highest wicket-taker in the 2004–05 Vijay Hazare Trophy, India's domestic 50 over tournament. Praveen Kumar first came to limelight for his performances for India Red in the NKP Salve Challenger Trophy 2007.

ODI Debut for India
He made his One Day International cricket debut for the India national cricket team against Pakistan national cricket team at Sawai Mansingh Stadium, Jaipur in November 2007.

He was later selected for the tri-nation Commonwealth Bank Series in 2008 in Australia against Australia national cricket team and Sri Lanka national cricket team and played an important role in the Indian triumph. He was noted for his swing and his battles against Ricky Ponting.

He established himself as the premier opening bowler for India in the ODIs from 2008 to 2010. He was selected for the ICC Cricket World Cup 2011 but owing to an injury was replaced by Sreesanth.

Test Debut for India
He made his Test debut against West Indies cricket team at Kingston in June 2011. He took a five wicket haul in the first Test match of India tour of England, 2011.

IPL career
Praveen Kumar was initially with the Royal Challengers Bangalore until 2010.

While at RCB he became the 6th bowler in Indian Premier League history to take a hat trick. He did this against the Rajasthan Royals in M. Chinnaswamy Stadium, Bangalore in 2010.

In 2008 while playing for RCB in a match against Rajasthan Royals he hit the joint biggest six in the history of the IPL. The shot which came off the bowling of Yusuf Pathan was measured at 124m in distance equally the record of Chennai Super Kings Albie Morkel in the same season.

In the Indian Premier League he played for Kings XI Punjab from 2011 to 2013. He was unsold in the 2014 IPL auction owing to high base price.

After going unsold in IPL 2014 Auction, Mumbai Indians signed him as their replacement for the injured Zaheer Khan. Zaheer, who played six games, was ruled out for the rest of the IPL 2014 season after straining his left latissimus dorsi muscle.

He was picked up by the Sunrisers Hyderabad in IPL 2015 auctions for a fee of 220 lakh Indian rupees.

He then went on to play for Gujarat Lions from 2016 to 2017. This was the last time he featured in IPL.

References

External links

 

1986 births
Living people
Indian cricketers
India Test cricketers
India One Day International cricketers
India Twenty20 International cricketers
Royal Challengers Bangalore cricketers
Mumbai Indians cricketers
Gujarat Lions cricketers
Central Zone cricketers
Cricketers at the 2011 Cricket World Cup
Uttar Pradesh cricketers
Punjab Kings cricketers
India Green cricketers
India Red cricketers